was a stable of sumo wrestlers, part of the Dewanoumi ichimon or group of stables. It was established in February 2000 by former maegashira Kushimaumi, who branched off from Dewanoumi stable. It was located in the Koto ward of Tokyo. In 2012 it had eight sumo wrestlers.

Tagonoura did not recruit any wrestlers from Nihon University, despite his own amateur sumo background there, and though he did recruit foreigners he avoided the most common sources such as Hawaii and Mongolia, instead taking in the Tongan Hisanoumi in 2001, and later the Bulgarian Aoiyama (Daniel Ivanov) who became the stable's first sekitori and reached the rank of maegashira 7 in January 2012. 

The  stable suffered a number of setbacks, including Tagonoura's heart attack in 2003, the death of a 17-year-old sandanme wrestler in 2004 and the death of a yobidashi in 2008. Following the death of Tagonoura in February 2012 the stable was dissolved, with half the wrestlers going to Dewanoumi stable and the other half, including Aoiyama, going to Kasugano stable.

Ring name conventions

Many wrestlers from this stable took shikona that begin with the character 碧 (read: aoi), meaning blue. Examples include Aoiyama, Aokishin and Aozora.

Owner
2000-2012: 14th: Tagonoura Keihito (former maegashira Kushimaumi)

Notable wrestlers
Aoiyama
Aotsurugi (aka Hisanoumi)

See also
List of sumo stables

References

External links
Official website
Tagonoura stable at the Japan Sumo Association

Defunct sumo stables